American Pie Presents: Band Camp is a 2005 American sex comedy film released by Universal Pictures. It is the first installment in American Pie Presents film series, a spin-off of the American Pie franchise.

Tad Hilgenbrinck stars as Matt Stifler, a troubled student sent to band camp to change his ways.

Chris Owen and Eugene Levy reprise their roles from previous American Pie films.

Plot 
Matt Stifler, the younger brother of Steve Stifler, is eager to enter a family business of making pornographic films to prove his "Stifmeister" behavior to his older brother, Steve. After Matt pulls a prank on the school band that goes too far, the school's guidance counselor Chuck "The Sherminator" Sherman, who attended high school with Steve, decides to punish Matt by sending him to band camp. Matt is initially dismissive of the idea, but is soon persuaded to agree, his interest piqued by the purportedly notorious sexual behavior of band camp girls.

Upon arrival, Matt is extremely disrespectful to the rules along with everyone at Tall Oaks and even gets his school's band in trouble. Jim's dad, Noah Levenstein, the camp's MACRO (Morale And Conflict Resolution Officer), recommends him to try to fit in for the band's trust. Matt conspires with his nerdy roommate, Ernie, to film the other band members in a bid called 'Bandeez Gone Wild' by using hidden cameras.

During a scuffle in lunch, Matt accepts a duel with the rival band leader Brandon, wherein the performers show off their music skills, with Brandon playing the snare drum, and Matt playing the triangle. When it seems Matt has lost, he leaves the stage and comes back playing the bagpipes, also wearing a kilt, to the tune of "Play That Funky Music" to win the duel. Matt befriends Elyse and are later attracted to each other and share a kiss while watching the clouds in the sky.

A day before the finals, the cheerleading squad of East Great Falls arrives and catches Matt in a band camp uniform. They tease him, taking a photo and plan to share it on the internet. Matt later offers a deal of showing them his film 'Bandeez Gone Wild' in exchange for deleting the photo. While showing them his video, Elyse turns up after he's unintentionally stood her up. Disappointed with Matt after seeing the video, she leaves.

The various school bands compete for points throughout camp with East Great Falls leading on the last day, but an ill-fated prank Matt meant for the rival team causes the band to lose and Elyse to possibly lose her opportunity for a scholarship. Once the new term starts, Matt visits Chuck, who reveals that he and the rest of Steve's friends really could not stand him.

Matt soon begins to fix his mistakes by deleting the naked videos he took of others at band camp, reconcile with his band camp buddies, and then persuade the school band to play Elyse's piece, Instrumental of Tal Bachman's Aeroplane, for the Conservatory head. Due to blatant plagiarism, Brandon has been disqualified and Elyse wins the scholarship, while Matt successfully wins her affection.

Cast

Soundtrack listing 
 Andrew W.K. – "She Is Beautiful"
 Breaking Benjamin – "Forget It"
 Snow Patrol – "How to Be Dead"
 Matt Nathanson – "Laid"
 Treble Charger – "American Psycho"
 Good Charlotte – "The Anthem"
 Paul Locke – "Paul's Drums"
 Jimmy Eat World – "The Middle"
 Jimmy Eat World – "The Authority Song"
 Courtesy of Associated Productions Music – "Dracula Plays"
 Courtesy of Associated Productions Music – "Pom Pom"
 Courtesy of Associated Productions Music – "Piano Sonata"
 Cage9 – "Breaking Me Down"
 Linda Perry – "Get the Party Started"
 D.O.R.K – "Jaime"
 The Penfifteen Club – "Disco MF"
 The City Drive – "Defeated"
 Wild Cherry – "Play That Funky Music"
 The City Drive – "Bring Me Everything"
 Christian B – "Baby Got Back"
 Steppenwolf – "Born to Be Wild"
 Tal Bachman – "Aeroplane"
 Chris Rash and Jean-Paul DiFranco – "Bonfire Etude"
 Ash – "Vampire Love"

Critical response 
The film has received negative reviews from critics. On Rotten Tomatoes, it has an approval rating of 17% based on 6 reviews.

Brian Costello of Common Sense Media described the film as a "crass and unnecessary sequel with lots of cursing, sex."

See also 

American Pie (film series)

References

External links 

 
 

2000s high school films
2000s sex comedy films
2000s teen comedy films
2005 direct-to-video films
American direct-to-video films
American high school films
American Pie (film series)
American sex comedy films
American teen comedy films
Direct-to-video comedy films
Direct-to-video sequel films
2000s English-language films
Films directed by Steve Rash
Films produced by Mike Elliott
Films scored by Robert Folk
Films shot in Los Angeles
Rogue (company) films
Films about summer camps
Universal Pictures direct-to-video films